The Selective Service Act of 1948, also known as the Elston Act, was a major revision of the Articles of War of the United States enacted June 24, 1948 that established the current implementation of the Selective Service System.

History
The previous iteration of the Selective Service System was established by the Selective Training and Service Act of 1940. After two extensions, the Selective Training and Service Act was allowed to expire on March 31, 1947. In 1948, it was replaced by a new and distinct Selective Service System established by this Act. The Selective Service Act of 1948 was originally intended to remain in effect for two years (i.e., until June 24, 1950), but was extended multiple times, usually immediately before its two-year period of effectiveness was due to expire.

The act has had amendments, extensions, and changes of name since 1948, including:

 Extended until July 9, 1950 by 
 Extended until July 9, 1951 by 
 Change of name to the Universal Military Training and Service Act and extended until July 1, 1953 by 
 Amended by 
 Extended until July 1, 1955 by 
 Extended until July 1, 1959 by 
 Amended by 
 Amended by 
 Amended by 
 Amended by 
 Extended until July 1, 1963 by 
 Amended by 
 Amended by 
 Amended by 
 Extended until July 1, 1967 by 
 Amended by 
 Amended by 
 Amended by 
 Change of name to the Military Selective Service Act of 1967 and extension until July 1, 1971 by 
 Amended by 
 Amended by 
 Change of name to the Military Selective Service Act and extension until July 1, 1973 by 

In 2019, U.S. District Court in Southern Texas Judge Gray Miller ruled in National Coalition for Men v. Selective Service System that exempting women from the male-only draft was unconstitutional. This ruling was later reversed by the United States Court of Appeals for the Fifth Circuit, and the case was declined by the US Supreme Court.

See also
 Selective Service System
 Conscription in the United States

References

External links
 Military Selective Service Act (PDF/details) as amended in the GPO Statute Compilations collection

Conscription in the United States
United States federal defense and national security legislation
1948 in law
1948 in military history
1948 in the United States
80th United States Congress
Conscription law